Casino Mogul is a business simulation game for Windows. In Europe the game is known as Casino Tycoon. The simulation allows you to design and manage your own casino, pick games that will pull in most reward while building and developing bars, gift shops, and hotels.

References

External links

2001 video games
Business simulation games
Casino video games
DreamCatcher Interactive games
Video games developed in France
Windows games
Windows-only games
Cat Daddy Games games
Single-player video games